Ross Beattie (born 15 November 1977) is a retired Scotland international rugby union player. His previous clubs were Newcastle Falcons & Bristol in the Premiership Rugby, RC Nice in France's Federale 1 and Newport Gwent Dragons in Wales.

Ross Beattie's position of choice is as a back-row forward.

References

External links
Newport Gwent Dragons profile
Newcastle Falcons profile

1977 births
Living people
Dragons RFC players
Scottish rugby union players
People from Sittingbourne
Rugby union players from Kent
Scotland international rugby union players
Newcastle Falcons players
Bristol Bears players
Rugby union number eights